Hollie Fullbrook is an Auckland-based singer and multi instrumentalist who is the face of Tiny Ruins. She collaborated with Hamish Kilgour on the Hurtling Through EP.

Background
Fullbrook was born in 1985 and is originally from Bristol, England. She migrated to New Zealand with her family at the age of 10.<ref>Sydney Morning Herald May 26, 2016 New Zealand folkie Tiny Ruins has a rich store of memories</ref>

Career
In later years, she performed under the alias of Tiny Ruins which later expanded to become a full band.
She collaborated with Hamish Kilgour and the result of their efforts was the Hurtling Through EP which was released in 2015.

In 2016, Fullbrook teamed up with Kilgour and former Terrorways and Gary Havoc & The HurricanesSimon Grigg The Terrorways (12.78 – 11.79) drummer Gary Hunt for a live rendition of the songs from the Hurtling Through release.

Recordings
 For Tiny Ruins recordings see Tiny Ruins discography

Appearances
 Carnivorous Plant Society - Carnivorous Plant Society - (no label) - (2014) - Vocals on "Would You Rather" and cello on "A.D.N.D."
 Calexico  – Edge Of The Sun - City Slang Slang 50072DLP  - (2015) - Vocals on "Let It Slip Away"
 Street Chant – Hauora'' - Arch Hill Recordings – AHR061, Flying Nun Records – FNLP557  - (2016) - Cello on "My Country"

References

New Zealand musicians
1985 births
Living people
Musicians from Bristol